The  was the fifth season of the Japan Football League, the third tier of the Japanese football league system.

Overview 

It was contested by 16 teams, and Otsuka Pharmaceuticals won the championship.

Table

Results

Top scorers

Attendance

Promotion and relegation 
Due to the Jatco team disbanding, the Regional League promotion series winner Thespa Kusatsu were promoted automatically. Runner-up Gunma Horikoshi were set to play Kyoto BAMB 1993 in the promotion and relegation series.

Gunma Horikoshi won the series at 8–2 aggregate score and earned promotion to JFL. Kyoto BAMB 1993 were relegated to Kansai regional league.

References 

2003
3